Fatisi is a suco in Laulara subdistrict, Aileu District, East Timor. The administrative area covers an area of  11.82 square kilometres and at the time of the 2010 census it had a population of 1156  people.

References

Populated places in Aileu District
Sucos of East Timor